Horace Williams Fuller (June 15, 1844 – October 26, 1901) was an American lawyer and editor who served as the first editor of The Green Bag, a late-19th- and early-20th century legal news and humor magazine.

Life and career 
Born in Augusta, Maine, his father was Benjamin Apthorp Gould Fuller, by profession a lawyer, who was for several years on the bench, and his grandfather was also a lawyer. His mother's maiden name was Harriet Seiden Williams. After getting an education at the Augusta High School and Phillips Academy, Exeter, Fuller came to Boston in 1861, and for several years devoted himself to business, beginning as a clerk in the office of Page, Richardson & Company.

The legal instincts of the family prevailed—Melville Fuller, the Chief Justice of the United States, was his cousin—and after reading law in the office of Henry W. Paine, and taking a course of instruction at the Boston University Law School, he was admitted to the Suffolk bar in 1876. He never appeared much in the courts, his business—so long as he continued to follow it—being mainly office practice and trusts. In 1877, he married Emily Gorham Carter, of Roxbury, and shortly afterwards made his home in Brookline, Massachusetts, where he thereafter resided.

Although Fuller never took a university course, he was such a constant student throughout his life that he attained a culture so broad and thorough that many readers were surprised to learn that he did not hold a college degree. He had an especial fondness for French literature, writing in his leisure hours, and contributing anonymously to magazines and the press, spirited translations from that language. His only acknowledged work in this line was a small volume entitled Noted French Trials, Impostors and Adventurers, published in 1882.

The Green Bag 
When The Green Bag was projected, its publishers, knowing Fuller's literary aptitudes, offered him the position of editor, which was accepted. Fuller threw himself into his new duties with vigor, and for many years was not only editor, but also, to a great extent, business manager. Although he relinquished the latter part of his duties after the first few years he kept up the literary portion with unflagging devotion, producing the 12 bound volumes of The Green Bag, from 1889 to 1901.

His editorial work not only made him known to the legal profession, but its incidental correspondence brought him into direct touch with many leading lawyers throughout the United States. For several years he was an active member of the American Bar Association. At its annual gatherings he had the opportunity of meeting the men who already knew him by reputation, or through exchange of letters, and who welcomed him cordially as a friend at first sight. Fuller never held office or took an active role in party politics. He felt, however, a keen interest in public affairs, and was always ready to give encouragement and effective personal work to what may be called conscience issues like Civil Service Reform.

Personal life 
Fuller also enjoyed participating in amateur theatre, specializing in character parts, in which he excelled – both in humorous characters and in those requiring pathos and delicate shades of acting. For many years he devoted much time and energy to the duties of manager of the Brookline Comedy Club, a position requiring peculiar tact and patience.

Although a member of several clubs, Fuller was essentially a home-lover. He was fond of the St. Botolph Club's Sunday afternoon musicales, he enjoyed golf at the Brookline Country Club, he played whist with neighbors, but his favorite evening resort was his own fireside, in the society of his wife, his sons and his friends. Here he was at his very best – a cordial host and a genial companion. The traits in his character, however, which many friends will remember most fondly, were his courtesy to women, his deference to age, and his thoughtful attentions to the sick and afflicted.

When Fuller gave up the editorial charge of The Green Bag at the end of 1900, he appeared to be in excellent health. However, on the morning of October 25, 1901, Fuller was stricken with apoplexy, and after lingering unconscious for a day, he died October 26, and was laid at rest two days later at Walnut Hills Cemetery.

His son was Benjamin A. G. Fuller (1879–1956), author of A History of Philosophy and president of the American Philosophical Association.

Footnotes

External links 
 
 

1844 births
1901 deaths
American lawyers admitted to the practice of law by reading law
American magazine editors
People from Augusta, Maine
People from Brookline, Massachusetts
Phillips Exeter Academy alumni